The First Battle of Chruślina was a clash between Polish insurgent forces and units of the Imperial Russian Army during the January Uprising. It took place  on May 30, 1863 near the village of Chruślina, which at that time belonged to Russian-controlled Congress Poland. Insurgent forces, commanded by Marcin Borelowski and Zygmunt Koskowski (180 men altogether) fought off a Russian detachment. The Poles lost 22 men; Russian losses were higher, but due to Russian numerical superiority, the insurgents had to withdraw towards Garwolin.

Sources 
 Stefan Kieniewicz: Powstanie styczniowe. Warszawa: Państwowe Wydawnictwo Naukowe, 1983. .

Conflicts in 1863
1863 in Poland
Chruslina
May 1863 events